The End of Chaos is the thirteenth studio album by American thrash metal band Flotsam and Jetsam, released on January 18, 2019. It was their first album to feature drummer Ken Mary (replacing Jason Bittner, who left Flotsam and Jetsam in 2017 to join Overkill), and the last to include bassist Michael Spencer before his split from the band in 2020.

Track listing

Personnel
 Eric "A.K." Knutson – vocals
 Michael Gilbert – guitars
 Michael Spencer – bass
 Steve Conley – guitars
 Ken Mary – drums

Charts

References

Flotsam and Jetsam (band) albums
2019 albums